Chlosyne melitaeoides, the red-spotted patch, is a species of crescents, checkerspots, anglewings, etc. in the butterfly family Nymphalidae.

The MONA or Hodges number for Chlosyne melitaeoides is 4501.1.

References

Further reading

 

melitaeoides
Articles created by Qbugbot